Roberto Moll (born 8 October 1933) is a Venezuelan equestrian. He competed in two events at the 1956 Summer Olympics.

References

External links
 

1933 births
Living people
Venezuelan male equestrians
Olympic equestrians of Venezuela
Equestrians at the 1956 Summer Olympics
Place of birth missing (living people)